Samraong municipality is a municipality (previously called 'district') in Oddar Meanchey province in northern Cambodia. It is the urban part of the province. The provincial capital Samraong lies in the district. According to the 1998 census of Cambodia, it had a population of 22,361.

Administration 
The following table shows the villages of Samraong municipality by commune.

References

Districts of Oddar Meanchey province